Hristo Botev is a football stadium in Botevgrad, Bulgaria. This is the club stadium of PFC Balkan Botevgrad. The capacity of the stadium is 8,000 seats. The seats are colored in green and white.

Football venues in Bulgaria
Buildings and structures in Sofia Province